The Directors Guild of America Award for Outstanding Directorial Achievement in Musical Variety was an annual award given by the Directors Guild of America between 1971 and 2012. In 2013, the guild announced the creation of two new accolades to replace the award: the Award for Outstanding Directorial Achievement in Variety/Talk/News/Sports – Regularly Scheduled Programming and the Award for Outstanding Directorial Achievement in Variety/Talk/News/Sports – Specials.

Winners and nominees

1970s

1980s

1990s

2000s

2010s

Individuals with multiple awards
7 awards
 Don Mischer

4 awards
 Dwight Hemion
 Glenn Weiss

3 awards
 Walter C. Miller
 Matthew Diamond

2 awards
 Jeff Margolis
 Beth McCarthy-Miller

Individuals with multiple nominations

16 nominations
 Louis J. Horvitz

13 nominations
 Don Mischer

9 nominations
 Hal Gurnee
 Chuck O'Neil
 Glenn Weiss

8 nominations
 Jerry Foley

7 nominations
 Dwight Hemion
 Jeff Margolis

6 nominations
 Don Roy King

5 nominations
 Tony Charmoli
 Arthur Fisher

4 nominations
 Bill Davis
 Matthew Diamond
 Beth McCarthy-Miller

3 nominations
 Emile Ardolino
 Ellen Brown
 Marty Callner
 Bruce Gowers
 Walter C. Miller

2 nominations
 Joel Gallen
 Roger Goodman
 Clark Jones
 Rob Marshall
 Paul Miller
 Dave Powers
 Don Scardino
 George Schaefer
 Thomas Schlamme
 Barbra Streisand

Total awards by network
 CBS – 12
 NBC – 12
 ABC – 7
 PBS – 7
 HBO – 3

References

External links
  (official website)

Directors Guild of America Awards